is a private university in Kanzaki, Saga, Japan. The school was established in 1968.

Educational institutions established in 1955
Private universities and colleges in Japan
Universities and colleges in Saga Prefecture
1955 establishments in Japan